Anthony Belleau (born 8 April 1996) is a French rugby union fly-half and he currently plays for Clermont in the Top 14.

International tries

References

External links
France profile at FFR
Toulon profile

1996 births
Living people
French rugby union players
RC Toulonnais players
ASM Clermont Auvergne players
Rugby union fly-halves
France international rugby union players